Vera Smith may refer to:

Vera Lutz (1912–1976), born Vera Smith, British economist
Vera Smith, character in The Dead Zone
Vera Smith (figure skater) (1932–2012), Canadian figure skater